The Angel of Vengeance – The Female Hamlet is a 1977 Turkish drama film directed by Metin Erksan. It was entered into the 10th Moscow International Film Festival.

Cast
 Fatma Girik as Hamlet
 Sevda Ferdag as Her Mother
 Reha Yurdakul as Her Uncle
 Orçun Sonat
 Ahmet Sezerel as Orhan
 Yüksel Gözen
 Yavuz Selekman
 Ihsan Gedik
 Baki Tamer
 Coskun Gögen

References

External links
 

1977 films
1977 drama films
Turkish drama films
1970s Turkish-language films
Films directed by Metin Erksan
Films based on Hamlet